Michael Denning (born 1954) is an American cultural historian and William R. Kenan, Jr. Professor of American Studies at Yale University.  His work has been influential in shaping the field of American Studies by importing and interpreting the work of British Cultural Studies theorists. Although he received his Ph.D. from Yale University and studied with Fredric Jameson, perhaps the greatest influence on his work is the time he spent at the Centre for Contemporary Cultural Studies working with Stuart Hall.

He is married to historian Hazel Carby.

References

21st-century American historians
American male non-fiction writers
Yale University faculty
Living people
Historians of the United States
Yale University alumni
1954 births
21st-century American male writers